The  Diocese of Orihuela-Alicante is a Roman Catholic ecclesiastical territory located in the cities of Orihuela  and Alicante in the Ecclesiastical province of Valencia in Spain. It was established as   Diocese of Orihuela from the Diocese of Cartagena in 1564, obtaining its current denomination in 1959.

Leadership

Gregorio Antonio Gallo de Andrade (22 Aug 1565 – 11 Sep 1577 )
Tomás Dacio (13 Jan 1578 – 19 May 1585 )
Cristóbal Senmanat y Robuster (17 Aug 1587 – 9 Nov 1593 )
José Esteve Juan (12 Jan 1594 – 2 Nov 1603)
Andrés Balaguer Salvador, O.P. (10 Nov 1604 – 11 Apr 1626 )
Bernardo Caballero Paredes (22 Mar 1627 – 13 Aug 1635 )
Juan García Arlés (7 Jan 1636 – 23 Mar 1644 )
Félix Guzmán, O.P. (14 Nov 1644 – 1 Mar 1646 )
Juan Orta Moreno (19 Nov 1646 – 5 Nov 1690 )
José de la Torre Orumbela (3 Oct 1701 – 6 Jan 1712 )
José Espejo Cisneros (28 May 1714 – 2 Jul 1717 )
Salvador Rodríguez Castelblanco, T.O.R. (22 Nov 1717 – 20 Jun 1727 )
José Flores Osorio (22 Dec 1727 – 3 Mar 1738 )
Juan Elías Gómez Terán (5 May 1738 – 9 Oct 1758 )
Pedro Albornoz Tapia (15 Dec 1760 – 22 Jan 1767 )
José Tormo Juliá (1 Jun 1768 – 26 Nov 1790 Died)
Antonio Despuig y Dameto (26 Sep 1791 – 1 Feb 1794 )
Francisco Javier Cabrera Velasco (1 Jun 1795 – 24 Jul 1797 )
Francisco Antonio Cebrián Valdá (23 Jul 1797 – 10 Jul 1815 )
Simón López García, C.O. (18 Dec 1815 – 27 Sep 1824 )
Félix Herrero Valverde (27 Jun 1824 – 29 Mar 1858 )
Pedro María Cubero López de Padilla (27 Sep 1858 – 10 Nov 1881 )
Victoriano Guisasola y Rodríguez (27 Mar 1882 – 10 Jun 1886 )
Juan Maura y Gelabert (10 Jun 1886 – 24 Jan 1910 )
Ramón Plaza y Blanco (18 Jul 1913 – 8 Nov 1921 )
Francisco Javier de Irastorza Loinaz (27 Jun 1922 – 29 Dec 1943 )
José García y Goldaraz (10 Aug 1944 – 25 Aug 1953 )
Pablo Barrachina Estevan (31 Mar 1954 – 12 May 1989 )
Francisco Alvarez Martínez (12 May 1989 – 23 Jun 1995 )
Victorio Oliver Domingo (22 Feb 1996 – 26 Nov 2005 )
Rafael Palmero Ramos (26 Nov 2005 – 27 Jul 2012)
Jesús Murgui Soriano (27 Jul 2012 – 7 Dec 2021)
José Ignacio Munilla Aguirre (7 Dec 2021 – )

See also
 History of Alicante
 Timeline of Alicante
Roman Catholicism in Spain

References

Sources
 GCatholic.org
 Catholic Hierarchy
  Diocese website
  Alicante's Catholic Cathedral website

Roman Catholic dioceses in Spain
Religious organizations established in the 1560s
1564 establishments in Spain
Roman Catholic dioceses established in the 16th century
Alicante